Dhyan Sreenivasan (born 20 December 1988) is an Indian actor,  and film director who works in Malayalam films. He made his acting debut with Thira (2013), directed by his elder brother Vineeth Sreenivasan.

Early and personal life
Dhyan is the younger son of noted actor and screenwriter Sreenivasan. His brother Vineeth Sreenivasan is a singer, actor and director who also works in Malayalam cinema. Dhyan married his longtime girlfriend Arpita Sebastian on 7 April 2017.

Career
He made his film debut with the Malayalam film Thira which has Shobana in main lead role. In the film, he did a supporting role along with two-time National Award winning actress Shobana. His performance in the film was generally well-received by critics and the audience.

Filmography

As actor 
All films are in Malayalam language unless otherwise noted.

As writer/director

As producer

References

External links 

Living people
Indian male film actors
Male actors from Kerala
Male actors from Kannur
Male actors in Malayalam cinema
1988 births
People from Thalassery
People from Kannur district
21st-century Indian male actors